Night of the Demons is a 2009 American horror film and remake of the 1988 film of the same name. It was directed by Adam Gierasch, who also co-wrote the screenplay with Jace Anderson, and stars Edward Furlong, Monica Keena, Bobbi Sue Luther, Shannon Elizabeth, Diora Baird, and Michael Copon.

Plot

The film opens in 1925, with scenes of gore and demons. Evangeline Broussard is in love with a man named Louis who is into black magic. At an evening gathering one night, Evangeline finds herself in a séance with demons who have been banished from Hell. If they get 7 human sacrifices, they can rise again and take over the human world. Rather than allow that to happen, Evangeline prepares to hang herself from her balcony when she is stopped by a man trying to reassure her that he is truly Louis and that she shouldn't hang herself. Evangeline calls him a liar, then jumps, hanging herself—and also causing her head to rip off and bounce down the stairs. Louis stares over the balcony...as his eyes switch to a demonic shade of orange.

Cut to present day: a girl named Maddie goes to a party held by Angela Feld with her friends Lily and Suzanne. She realizes her ex-boyfriend Colin is there, dealing drugs. Also there is Lily's ex-boyfriend Dex and his friend Jason. At the party, Angela prompts everyone to go wild, as she must make money off the party or she will have to live on the streets. Lily and Dex eventually reunite, while Suzanne becomes incredibly drunk. Maddie goes to the toilet, only to have a hand grab her through the mirror. They pass it off as an elaborate trick placed by Angela.

Police break up the party. Panicked, Colin stuffs his drugs into a grate to hide it from the police before leaving. Maddie, Lily, Dex and Jason leave with the rest, leaving an upset Angela alone in the house. After a while, the group returns, unable to find Suzanne, who is revealed to have passed out. Colin returns for his drugs and, with Angela, goes into the basement to find them. The pair find a hidden door, and Angela remarks that the house is full of hidden rooms, including a tunnel that leads to the next estate over. They enter the room and find six skeletons. Angela surmises that the skeletons are the remains of the missing party guests of Evangeline Broussard.

One of the skeletons bites Angela's hand, which causes her to feel woozy. Colin attempts to leave the house, only to discover that the gate is locked and can't be opened. While everyone plans to wait the night out, Suzanne details how Evangeline supposedly practiced black magic in the hopes that she would attract the attention of Louis, only to have that magic go wrong. The only person found alive was the maid, who was found scribbling spells on her walls, having been driven insane by the night's events.

Angela slowly succumbs to the skeleton bite—and turns into a demon. She returns to the group, who partake in a game of spin the bottle. Angela infects Dex by kissing him. Lily angrily leads Dex into a nearby room, where the pair have sex. Dex transforms into a demon and infects Lily. Angela then attempts to seduce the others while Maddie, Jason and Colin leave to find another exit but can't. Angela successfully seduces Suzanne and then rips her breasts and face, turning her into a demon. Jason sees Lily pressing her lipstick into her breast, then voiding it out through her vagina. He warns the others who do not believe him until a demonic Suzanne attacks them. They decide to leave through the house's escape tunnel. On their way, they arm themselves with a gun and a metal bar. They discover the tunnel has caved in before being attacked by Lily and Dex. They manage to fend off the demons but Jason is injured. The survivors run upstairs and tend to Jason's injury. They realize that not only are they in the maid's room but that the symbols remained on the walls. They discover that the demons are attempting to take over seven human hosts to be freed upon the earth, having been thrown out of hell for trying to usurp Satan's rule. The demons had tricked Evangeline into hosting the party so they could take over the guests. The demons can't take over a dead body, which is why Evangeline hung herself. They also find out that the demons don't like rust, finding that they can use it as a weapon.

As the boys fall asleep, Angela taunts Maddie but is unable to enter the room due to the spells. The walls begin pouring with blood, washing off the spells. The trio attempt to re-draw the spells but are lured out of the room when the demons fake daylight in the windows. The demons attack them. Maddie and Colin rush back to the room, while Jason is caught and disemboweled by Angela turning him into a demon.

As they plan to wait in the room until sunrise, Colin falls through the rotten floorboards, falling many floors into the basement. Maddie climbs down a rope into the basement to help him, but he is now a demon. Maddie manages to get back to the maid's room and fights the demons. She makes her way to the balcony, where she ties a rope around her neck and jumps over, seemingly hanging herself. As the sun rises, the demons are killed. Maddie reveals that she only pretended to hang herself, having tied the rope around her waist and the demons merely assumed that she was dead. Maddie is then able to exit through the gates to her freedom.

Cast

Production
Principal photography took place in New Orleans in October 2008. There are several differences between the original and the remake, with the most notable being the change in location as well as an updated plot. Linnea Quigley, who starred in the original film as Suzanne, has a cameo in this film. The special effects and FX effects were created by Drac Studios.

Soundtrack

 "Night of the Demons" – 45 Grave
 "Ghastly Stomp" – Ghastly Ones
 "Boris Karloff" – The Barbarellatones
 "Aim for the Head" – Creature Feature
 "No Costume, No Candy" – The Swingin' Neckbreakers
 "Incredible Two Headed Transplant" – Haunted Garage
 "The World Belongs to You" – The Death Riders
 "Bloodletting (The Vampire Song)" – Concrete Blonde
 "Blood, Brains & Rock 'N' Roll" – Zombie Girl
 "Code Blue" – T.S.O.L.
 "Legions of the Damned" – DeadbyDay
 "Gimme Gimme Bloodshed" – Wednesday 13
 "Invasion of the Ball Snatchers" – Psycho Charger
 "Black Lung" – Frankenstein
 "Black No. 1" – Type O Negative
 "Reckoning of the Soul Made Godless" – Goatwhore

Release
The film originally premiered at the London FrightFest Film Festival in August 2009, with plans to release it in October of the same year, but the film was pushed back for a tentative release date for September 23, 2010.

Night of the Demons was released straight-to-DVD and Blu-ray on October 19, 2010 as opposed to a theatrical release. The release contains extras such as an audio commentary with the film crew, a documentary about the making of the film, and a Comic-Con appearance.

Reception
Critical reception has been mostly negative, with review aggregator Rotten Tomatoes rating the film at 35% "rotten" based upon 17 reviews.

Dread Central gave a mixed review for the remake and gave it 3 blades out of 5: "It's brash, loud and sexy but a few too obvious flaws unfortunately knock the film down a peg. In the end it's still a fun ride...and certainly worth a watch on an evening when you'd rather disengage the brain and sink a few drinks than deal with anything more cerebral". Fright Fest director and founder commented that the audience response in general was noted to be positive for the film. The film was a box office bomb, grossing $64,000 against a $10 million budget.

Sequel
In June 2013, Tenney announced plans to create a sequel to the 2009 film, entitled After Party. Gierasch did not return as director, and Anthony Hickox was attached to direct the film. A Kickstarter campaign was launched with a goal of $250,000 but was unsuccessful.

The projected plot for After Party was to center on the character of Diana, one of Angela's former friends and associates, who would hold a party in the same mansion and become possessed by the now-demonic Angela.

References

External links
 
 

2009 films
2009 horror films
2000s comedy horror films
American comedy horror films
Remakes of American films
Demons in film
Halloween horror films
Films directed by Adam Gierasch
Films scored by Joseph Bishara
Films shot in New Orleans
Films about witchcraft
Horror film remakes
American supernatural horror films
American erotic horror films
Night of the Demons (film series)
2009 comedy films
2000s English-language films
2000s American films